= Nazirabad Thanda =

- village
- Interactive map of Nazirabad Thanda
- Coordinates: 17.20°N 78.28°E
- Country: India
- State: Telangana
- District: Rangareddy

Languages
  - Official: Telugu
- Time zone: UTC+5:30 (IST)
- PIN: 501501
- Telephone code: 08412
- Vehicle registration: AP-28
- Nearest city: hyderabad
- Lok Sabha constituency: chevella

Nazirabad Thanda is a tribal village under Pargi jurisdiction in Rangareddy District, in the Indian state of Telangana. The name Thanda derives from the fact that only Lambadi(Banjara) community people live there. The population is greater than 1,000 people.
